Pheidole pilifera is a species of ant and a higher myrmicine in the family Formicidae.

Subspecies
These four subspecies belong to the species Pheidole pilifera:
 Pheidole pilifera artemisia Cole, 1933 i c g
 Pheidole pilifera coloradensis Emery, 1895 i c g
 Pheidole pilifera pacifica Wheeler, 1915 i c g
 Pheidole pilifera pilifera (Roger, 1863) i c g
Data sources: i = ITIS, c = Catalogue of Life, g = GBIF, b = Bugguide.net

References

Further reading

External links

 

pilifera
Articles created by Qbugbot
Insects described in 1863